Ini Varum Kaalam is a 2008 Indian Tamil language romantic drama film directed by Sibi Chandar. The film stars Ranjan and Sajitha Betti, with Ravichandran, Ramesh Kanna, Anu Mohan, T. P. Gajendran, O. A. K. Sundar and Saranya Ponvannan playing supporting roles.

Plot

Aravind (Ranjan), a jobless graduate, lives with his widowed mother (Saranya Ponvannan) and his uncle (Ramesh Kanna) in the city. Aravind bumps into the college student Aarthi (Sajitha Betti) in different situations and he slowly falls in love with her. In the meantime, he finds a job in a car dealership company and his first assignment is to buy a rare model car from the adamant and retired military officer Chandramouli (Ravichandran). Aravind gets acquainted with Chandramouli and they befriend, the old man turns out to be Aarthi's grandfather. One day, his uncle steals Chandramouli's car in order to help Aravind. Chandramouli is deeply shocked by the theft, he has a heart attack and is admitted to the hospital. Aravind then brings him back the car and Chandramouli is cured.

Aravind professes his love to Aarthi and Aarthi eventually reciprocates his love. Their respective family accept to marry them. In the meantime, the gangster Thamba (O. A. K. Sundar) is hired to kill a politician. That night, in the middle of the road, Thamba and his henchmen waited to attack the politician's car. Aravind and Aarthi travel by motorbike and Aravind's motorbike break down, he decides to go to the mechanic shop and Aarthi waits for his return. Thamba who doesn't want to wreck his plan asks Aarthi to move but she refuses and an angry Thamba beats her up. When Aravind sees his girlfriend in danger, he gets dizzy and runs away. He then returns and trows toward Thamba a molotov cocktail, Thamba is disfigured by the attack and he escapes with his henchmen. Aarthi, still shocked by the incident, is disgusted by Aravind's cowardness and refuses to marry him. Thereafter, a vengeful Thamba brutally stabs Aravind on the street and Chandramouli who happened to pass by takes him to the hospital. In the hospital, Aravind's mother explains to Chandramouli and Aarthi why Aravind behaved like this that night.

In the past, Aravind was a cheerful and brave child in a remote village. One day, he witnessed his teacher being stabbed and burned alive by a rowdy in his classroom. Aravind was traumatized by what he had seen and developed posttraumatic stress disorder.

Back to the present, Thamba is involved in land grabbing and forces an orphanage to give him their land. On Independence Day, Aravind, Aarthi and their family are invited to celebrate it with the orphan kids. Thamba and his henchmen start to beat up the participants including Aravind. Aravind begins to lose consciousness but the encouragement of his well-wishers gives him the boost to hit back and he beats them up.

Cast

Ranjan as Aravind
Sajitha Betti as Aarthi
Ravichandran as Chandramouli
Ramesh Kanna as Saba, Aravind's uncle
Anu Mohan as Mohan
T. P. Gajendran as Azhagu
O. A. K. Sundar as Thamba
Saranya Ponvannan as Aravind's mother
Bhadrakali Rajasekhar
Benjamin
Nishat
Shanthi Anand as Teacher
Nimmy
Halwa Vasu as Restaurant waiter
Thadi Balaji as Thirumoorthy
Thideer Kannaiah as Siddha doctor
G. S. Murali
Jayagovindan
 Bava Lakshmanan as Thief
Vincent Roy
Kottai Perumal as Orphanage worker
Sivan Seenivasan
Rajendranath as Police inspector

Production
Sibi Chandar made his directorial debut with Ini Varum Kaalam under the banner of Saamundi Chitra. Newcomer Ranjan was chosen to play the hero while Sajitha Betti, credited as Parveen Kapoor, was selected to play his love interest. Speaking about the film, the director said, "A romantic film, it also deals with a contemporary problem. It is about a middle-class family affected by the aftermath of violence. The film also leaves a message that life is much better in a non-violent society". The film was shot in 20 days.

Soundtrack

The film score and the soundtrack were composed by Bharani. The soundtrack features 5 tracks.

The audio was released in 2008 in Chennai. Sathyaraj, K. Rajan and Rama Narayanan attended the audio function.

References

2008 films
2000s Tamil-language films
2008 romantic drama films
Indian romantic drama films
Films about post-traumatic stress disorder